Alexander Erler and Lucas Miedler were the defending champions but lost in the final to Ivan and Matej Sabanov.

Sabanov and Sabanov won the title after defeating Erler and Miedler 3–6, 7–5, [10–4] in the final.

Seeds

Draw

References

External links
 Main draw

Sibiu Open - Doubles
2022 Doubles